Events in the year 1644 in Portugal.

Incumbents
King: John IV

Events
May 26 - Battle of Montijo

References

 
1640s in Portugal
Portugal